Pokhara is a genus of harvestmen in the family Sclerosomatidae from Nepal.

Species
 Pokhara kathmandica J. Martens, 1987
 Pokhara lineata Suzuki, 1970
 Pokhara minuta J. Martens, 1987
 Pokhara occidentalis J. Martens, 1987
 Pokhara quadriconica J. Martens, 1987
 Pokhara trisulensis J. Martens, 1987
 Pokhara uenoi J. Martens, 1987

References

Harvestmen